Ralph Keeler (also Keiler) (1613 – September 10, 1672) was a founding settler of both Hartford, and Norwalk, Connecticut, United States.

Early life
Ralph Keeler is thought have been born in Lawford, Essex, England in 1613, perhaps the son of another Ralph Keeler who died in Essex in the early 17th century.

America
He settled at Hartford in about 1639. His home-lot was on what is now the West Park, north of the present site of the Capitol. He was chimney-viewer in 1645. In 1647, he brought Nicholas Gynings to court for "a miscaridge, beateing of [his] Cow". In 1648, he was accused of slander by John Webb, but the jury found in favor of Keeler.

He was one of the signatories to the agreement for planting Norwalk in June 1650.

He sold his lot in Hartford, and moved to Norwalk in 1651 or 1652, where his brother Walter Keeler also settled.

On October 21, 1662, he sold his four-acre lot to Richard Raymond. On September 1, 1665, he bought the house, barn and lot of Thomas Ward.

He was named a freeman in 1668.

He, along with Walter Hoyt, was contracted by the settlement to cut the timber and build a house for Reverend Thomas Hanford. At a town meeting in September 1668, he was contracted to build forty rods of fence.

Legacy

He is listed on the Founders Stone bearing the names of the founders of Hartford in the Ancient Burying Ground in Hartford, and he is also listed on the Founders Stone bearing the names of the founders of Norwalk in the East Norwalk Historical Cemetery.

Notable descendants 
 Edwin O. Keeler, first mayor of Norwalk after the city's incorporation from 1893 to 1894, Lieutenant Governor of Connecticut from 1901 to 1903.
 Anson F. Keeler, mayor of Norwalk from 1927 to 1930, member of the Connecticut Senate in 1931, Connecticut State Comptroller from 1933 to 1935
 Norman Rockwell, American painter

References 

1613 births
1672 deaths
American carpenters
American Puritans
Founders of Hartford, Connecticut
Founding settlers of Norwalk, Connecticut
People from Tendring (district)
People from Essex (before 1965)